Jeon Jun-bum (born 29 September 1986) is a South Korean badminton player. Born in Jeonju, Jeon has shown his talent in doubles category when he won the Dutch and German Junior boys' doubles title in 2003. Jeon who was educated at the Jeonju Life Science high school, was part of the Korean national junior team that won the silver medal at the 2004 Asian Junior Championships in the boys' team event, also clinched the silver medal in the boys' doubles event partnered with Yoo Yeon-seong. At the same year, he also competed at the World Junior Championships, clinched the silver medal in the mixed team event and a bronze medal in the boys' doubles event. Jeon affiliated with the Wonkwang University, he won his first senior international title at the 2006 Mongolia Satellite tournament, and claimed the World Grand Prix title at the Vietnam Open.

Achievements

World Junior Championships 
Boys' doubles

Asian Junior Championships 
Boys' doubles

IBF World Grand Prix 
The World Badminton Grand Prix sanctioned by International Badminton Federation (IBF) since 1983.

Men's doubles

IBF International 
Men's doubles

Mixed doubles

References

External links 
 

1986 births
Living people
People from Jeonju
South Korean male badminton players
Sportspeople from North Jeolla Province